Miguel Parra Abril (1780, Valencia - 13 October 1846, Madrid) was a Spanish artist who served as court painter to King Ferdinand VII. He is best known for his portraits and still-lifes; mostly of floral arrangements. The famous portrait painter, Vicente López Portaña, was his brother-in-law.

Biography 
He studied with Benito Espinós, in the School of Flowers and Ornamentation at the Real Academia de Bellas Artes de San Carlos de Valencia. In 1803, he was named an Academician of Merit for flower painting there and, in 1811, received the same title for history painting. While there, he worked at the Estudio de Flores, where he created designs for the silk industry.

In 1812, he was appointed an assistant professor of painting at the Academia but, in 1814, failed to succeed Espinós as a professor. Due to this, in 1815, following the Peninsular War, he moved to Madrid, where he presented the King with several canvases depicting the King's recent triumphal return. This earned him a royal appointment. He eventually had to return to Valencia, due to his parents' poor health, but continued to submit paintings to the court; receiving an annual pension of 600 Ducats. In 1821, he was named Director of Painting at the Academia and, two years, became General Director.

After the death of King Ferdinand, he continued to be associated with the court; becoming the favorite painter of the Regent, Maria Christina.

He oversaw the career of his son, José Felipe (1824-1864), who also became a painter. He died while accompanying Josép on a trip to Madrid; to present his works to Queen Isabella II.

His works may be seen at the Museu de Belles Artes, the Royal Palace of Madrid and Valencia cathedral, among others.

References

Further reading 
 Alfonso E. Pérez Sánchez, Pintura española de bodegones y floreros de 1600 a Goya. (Exhibition catalog), 1983, Ministerio de Cultura 
Alba Pagán, Ester. La pintura y los pintores valencianos durante la guerra de la Independencia y el reinado de Fernando VII (1808 - 1833). Tesi doctoral. Universitat de València, 2004.

External links 

Biography @ Museo del Prado

1780 births
1846 deaths
People from Valencia
19th-century Spanish painters
19th-century Spanish male artists
Spanish male painters
Spanish floral still life painters